The Alborn skink (Oligosoma albornense) is a critically endangered and poorly known species of skink only found in a single 2 ha site near Reefton, New Zealand. It is classified as "Nationally Critical" by the Department of Conservation under the New Zealand Threat Classification System.

Taxonomy
For many years the speckled skink (Oligosoma infrapunctatum) was considered to be a widespread and common New Zealand species, but genetic analysis revealed it is actually a species complex made up of numerous localised and visually similar but genetically distinct skink species.

In 1992 a distinctive population of speckled skinks were identified by Tony Whitaker and Mike Meads at a site near Reefton, on the West Coast of the South Island. These were re-identified in a Department of Conservation lizard survey in 1997–1998. A 2008 molecular analysis by Greaves et al. identified the Alborn Coal Mine skinks as genetically distinct from other populations of O. infrapunctatum. A 2019 study confirmed this, named and described the species Oligosoma albornense, and established its closest relative was the Kapitia skink (O. salmo). The O. albornense/O. salmo clade is one of several distinct lineages of speckled skink that originated in the Pliocene and survived multiple glacial cycles in Westland.

Name
The species takes its name from its type locality, the Alborn Coal Mine, which the Alborn family operated from 1908 to 1966.

Description 
Although O. albornense is genetically distinct from other members of the speckled skink complex, it looks similar and can only be distinguished by several subtle characters: less than 69 ventral scales unlike O. newmani, a narrower head than O. robinsoni, more subdigital lamellae and a shorter tail than O. auroraensis. It is a long slender skink with a brown speckled back and a pale dorsolateral stripe with notched edges. A dark brown lateral band is bordered below by a thin pale notched stripe. The stripes do not continue down the (intact) tail, which is at least as long as the body and lacks the colourful blotched underside of O. salmo. Alborn skinks have dark brown eyes and wedge-shaped snouts with a grey chin and throat. Unlike O. infrapunctatum, their underside is ochre-yellow, turning grey partway down the tail. Their snout-vent length is up to 87 mm, and they weigh on average 11.5 g.

Range 
O. albornense is endemic to New Zealand and has been recorded from just one 2 ha site, the Alborn Coal Mine south of Reefton, near Big River. This a mid-altitude (550 m) cool-temperature site with high rainfall.

Habitat 

The Alborn Coal Mine had been abandoned for 30 years when this species was first found around discarded mining machinery, in an area that had been cleared but was filled with regenerating native vegetation. Their preferred habitat may be native shrubland and gaps in beech forest. It has also been found in nearby pākihi wetland and seems tolerant of wet conditions; when the pākihi floods during heavy rain, the skinks climb to logs and high points to keep clear of the water.

Conservation 

O. albornense is classified as "Nationally Critical" in the Department of Conservation's New Zealand Threat Classification System. Before 2015 there were only 7 records of the species, and by 2017 less than 20 individuals had ever been seen. Recent searches of the 2 ha habitat have found only a single individual. Their very small range makes them vulnerable to extinction, and they are probably being preyed upon by mice, rats, mustelids, and weka.

The skink habitat is off-limits to vehicles, but in November 2020 four-wheel-drive vehicles drove over and through the habitat, churning up terrain and destroying skink-monitoring pit covers. Vandals cut down trees to make tracks, destroyed fences and gates, and turned part of the habitat into a "mud hole".

References

External links 

 The Alborn skink discussed in RNZ Critter of the Week, 14 December 2018
Holotype of the Alborn skink in the collection of Museum of New Zealand Te Papa Tongarewa

Oligosoma
Reptiles described in 2019
Reptiles of New Zealand
Endemic fauna of New Zealand
Taxa named by Sabine Melzer
Taxa named by Rod A. Hitchmough
Taxa named by Trent Bell
Taxa named by David G. Chapple
Taxa named by Geoff B. Patterson
Reefton
Endemic reptiles of New Zealand